A whipsaw or pitsaw was originally a type of saw used in a saw pit, and consisted of a narrow blade held rigid by a frame and called a frame saw or sash saw (see illustrations). This evolved into a straight, stiff blade without a frame, up to 14 feet long and with a handle at each end. The upper handle was called the tiller and the lower one the box, so called from its appearance and because it could be removed when the saw was taken out of one cut to be positioned in another. The whipsaw was used close to the felling site to reduce large logs to beams and planks. 

Sawyers either dug a large pit or constructed a sturdy platform, enabling a two-man crew to saw, one positioned below the log called the pit-man, the other standing on top called the top-man. The saw blade teeth were angled and sharpened as a rip saw so as to only cut on the downward stroke. On the return stroke, the burden of lifting the weight of the saw was shared equally by the two sawyers, thereby reducing fatigue and backache. The pitman had to contend with sawdust in his mouth and eyes and the risk of being crushed by a falling log, although modern photographs show the saw dust falling, as would be expected, away from the pitman, the teeth being on the opposite edge from him.

Gallery

See also 
 Two-man saw

References
 The New Shorter Oxford English Dictionary. 1993.
 Arnoult, Annie, La Grande Histoire des Scieurs de Long, 2 volumes, Feurs (France), 1996 and 2001.
 Salaman, R. A., Dictionary of Woodworking Tools, revised 2nd edition, 1989.

External links 
The Wisconsin Logging Book, 1839-1939: Whipsaw to up-and-down saw 

Saws
Timber preparation